Venus Pencils were a brand name of pencils made by the American Lead Pencil Company beginning in 1905. The production of Venus pencils gave the company an early start in the manufacture of high-quality pencils marketed to artists and architects. Venus pencils became even more popular after the First World War, which had interrupted the supply of pencil from German companies.

Varieties 
Venus Pencils were produced in a total of seventeen degrees under the categories of very soft, soft, medium, hard, and very hard. They were made with no eraser, a tip and eraser, or an oversized tip and eraser.

Name changes 
In 1956, the American Lead Pencil Company officially changed its name to the Venus Pen and Pencil Corporation. A number of acquisitions followed, and in 1967, the company name was changed to Venus-Esterbrook. In 1973, the company was acquired by Faber-Castell.

See also
 Esterbrook

External links
 An American Lead Pencil Company photo list
 A brief description of The American Lead Pencil Company history
 Early history of Venus pencils and different varieties of Venus pencils

Products introduced in 1905
Pencil brands